The Men's Freestyle +100 kg at the 1984 Summer Olympics as part of the wrestling program were held at the Anaheim Convention Center, Anaheim, California.

Medalists

Tournament results 
The wrestlers are divided into 2 groups. The winner of each group decided by a double-elimination system. 
Legend
TF — Won by Fall
ST — Won by Technical Superiority, 12 points difference
PP — Won by Points, 1-7 points difference, the loser with points
PO — Won by Points, 1-7 points difference, the loser without points
SP — Won by Points, 8-11 points difference, the loser with points
SO — Won by Points, 8-11 points difference, the loser without points
P0 — Won by Passivity, scoring zero points
P1 — Won by Passivity, while leading by 1-7 points
PS — Won by Passivity, while leading by 8-11 points
DC — Won by Decision, 0-0 score
PA — Won by Opponent Injury
DQ — Won by Forfeit
DNA — Did not appear
L — Losses
ER — Round of Elimination
CP — Classification Points
TP — Technical Points

Eliminatory round

Group A

Group B

Final round

Final standings

References

External links
Official Report

Freestyle 99kg